Gujara (Nepali: गुजरा) is a municipality in Rautahat District, a part of Madhesh Province in Nepal. It was formed in 2016 occupying current 9 sections (wards) from previous 9 former VDCs.।

References 

Populated places in Rautahat District
Nepal municipalities established in 2017
Municipalities in Madhesh Province